The International Junior Science Olympiad (IJSO) is an annual science competition for students aged 15 and under. It is one of International Science Olympiads and the only international academical competition that covers physics, chemistry and biology at the same time. The first IJSO was held in Jakarta, Indonesia in 2004. Around 70 countries send delegations of three to six students, plus one to three team leaders, and observers.

The competition is broken down into three tests, each of which lasts between three and four hours. The theoretical portion consists of two tests: a multiple choice questionnaire consisting of 30 questions, and a theoretical test. The practical portion consists of three laboratory examinations, one for each field.

Incidents 
Because of COVID-19, the 17th International Junior Science Olympiad 2020, originally planned to be held in Frankfurt, Germany, was cancelled.

Due to the COVID-19 pandemic, the 18th International Junior Science Olympiad 2021 was conducted in a hybrid format. This allowed students from the participating countries to participate without travelling to the host country United Arab Emirates.

Summary

References

External links 

 

International Science Olympiad
Recurring events established in 2004